Karl Pregizer (4 August 1872 – 19 November 1956) was a German architect. His work was part of the architecture event in the art competition at the 1928 Summer Olympics.

References

1872 births
1956 deaths
20th-century German architects
Olympic competitors in art competitions
People from Tübingen